The 2019–20 Northern Illinois Huskies men's basketball team represent Northern Illinois University in the 2019–20 NCAA Division I men's basketball season. The Huskies, led by 9th-year head coach Mark Montgomery, play their home games at the Convocation Center in DeKalb, Illinois as members of the West Division of the Mid-American Conference.

Previous season
The Huskies finished the 2018–19 season 17–17 overall, 8–10 in MAC play to finish in fourth place in the West Division. As the No. 7 seed in the MAC tournament, they defeated Ohio in the first round, upset Toledo in the quarterfinals, before falling to Bowling Green in the semifinals.

Roster

Schedule and results

|-
!colspan=12 style=| Exhibition

|-
!colspan=12 style=| Non-conference regular season

|-
!colspan=12 style=| MAC regular season

|-
!colspan=9 style=| MAC tournament
|-

|-

Source

References

Northern Illinois Huskies men's basketball seasons
Northern Illinois Huskies
Northern Illinois Huskies men's basketball
Northern Illinois Huskies men's basketball